Reddellzomus is a monotypic genus of hubbardiid short-tailed whipscorpions, first described by Luis de Armas in 2002. Its single species, Reddellzomus cubensis is distributed in Cuba.

References 

Schizomida genera
Monotypic arachnid genera